John Doughty  (c.1562 – 20 December 1629) was an English Member of Parliament in the House of Commons from 1626 to 1629.

He was the son of John Doughty, a yeoman of Stottesdon, Shropshire.

He was a common councilman of Bristol from 1606 to 1620 and an alderman from 1620 to his death. He was elected sheriff of Bristol for 1606–07 and mayor for 1620–21.

In 1626 he was elected Member of Parliament for Bristol and was re-elected in 1628, sitting until 1629 when King Charles decided to rule without parliament for eleven years. In 1629 he established a charity of £100 for ten hand craftsmen.

He married Mary, and had 3 sons and 6 daughters.

References

 

Members of the Parliament of England for Bristol
Mayors of Bristol
Place of birth missing
High Sheriffs of Bristol
English MPs 1626
English MPs 1628–1629
Year of birth uncertain
1629 deaths